Levert F. Carr (born June 30, 1944) is a former American football player who played four seasons in the National Football League with the Buffalo Bills and Houston Oilers. He first enrolled at Independence Community College before transferring to North Central College. He attended John R. Buchtel High School in Akron, Ohio. Carr was also a member of the San Diego Chargers and Portland Storm.

References

External links
Just Sports Stats
WFL profile

Living people
1944 births
Players of American football from Birmingham, Alabama
American football offensive linemen
American football defensive tackles
African-American players of American football
Independence Pirates football players
North Central College alumni
San Diego Chargers players
Buffalo Bills players
Houston Oilers players
Portland Storm players
American Football League players
21st-century African-American people
20th-century African-American sportspeople